Hassan Balah (1 July 1942 – 16 March 2017) was an Iraqi football defender who played for Iraq between 1963 and 1969. He played at the 1966 Arab Nations Cup.  

On 16 March 2017, Balah died in Baghdad at the age of 74.

Career statistics

International goals
Scores and results list Iraq's goal tally first.

References

Iraqi footballers
Iraq international footballers
1942 births
2017 deaths
Association football defenders